Blues Sonata is an album by American jazz guitarist Charlie Byrd featuring tracks recorded in 1961 and  released on the Riverside label in 1963. The album was first released on the Washington Records Offbeat imprint but only received limited distribution prior to Byrd signing with Riverside.

Reception

Allmusic awarded the album 3 stars stating "this is really two albums in one sleeve, showcasing two rather different formats for this highly original guitarist to pursue".

Track listing
All compositions by Charlie Byrd except as indicated
 "The Blues Sonata: Polonaise for Pour Pietro" - 7:01     
 "The Blues Sonata: Ballad in B Minor" - 5:01     
 "The Blues Sonata: Scherzo for an Old Shoe" - 9:08     
 "Alexander's Ragtime Band" (Irving Berlin) - 5:26     
 "Jordu" (Duke Jordan) - 4:37     
 "That Ole Devil Called Love" (Doris Fisher, Allan Roberts) - 4:52     
 "Zing! Went the Strings of My Heart" (James F. Hanley) - 4:30

Personnel 
Charlie Byrd - guitar
Barry Harris - piano (tracks 4-7)
Keter Betts - bass 
Buddy Deppenschmidt - drums

References 

1963 albums
Charlie Byrd albums
Riverside Records albums